Kingdom Assembly of Iran, also The Monarchy Assembly Iran, Soldiers of the Kingdom Assembly of Iran, Iran Monarchy Committee, or Tondar, is an Iranian exile monarchist opposition group based in Los Angeles, United States which seeks to overthrow the Islamic Republic and restore the Iranian monarchy under a new dynasty. The group is currently banned in the Islamic Republic of Iran. Tondar means 'thunder' in Persian.

Organization 
The Kingdom Assembly of Iran formerly ran a satellite television from London, named 'Your TV'. It stopped broadcasting in 2008. API then initiated radio and television broadcasts from Los Angeles named 'Radio Tondar'.

Exact membership of the API remains unknown. In 2010, the group claimed "100,000 members in the U.S.", despite experts estimating it to have a size of a few hundred worldwide.

Ideology and platform 
The core ideology of the Kingdom Assembly of Iran is monarchism, which it on embraces more on organic, emotional and romantic elements rather than a political reasoning. In contrast to typical monarchists who glorify the Pahlavi dynasty, the group looks back more to pre-Islamic Persian Empire as a source of inspiration.

The group is staunchly against Islam and characterizes it as "alien" and "violent". In a posting, the Kingdom Assembly of Iran blames fourteen hundreds of "shameful Islamic tradition" as the fundamental problem of Iran, instead of the Iranian government itself or its human rights abuses and economic condition. The group uses race and ethnicity as a main theme for its agenda, using the word Tāzī for Arab people and drawing a distinction line between Iranian/Persian and Islamic/Arabic identity.

The group considers anyone associated with the Iranian government to be a "traitor", and makes no distinguish between the reformists and the conservatives. It showed no sympathy towards the Green Movement of Iran and disapproved its non-violent nature of protest and its "unpure" demands for democracy. However, Iranian authorities tried to discredit 2009 Iranian presidential election protests by linking them to groups such as the Kingdom Assembly of Iran during a series of trials.

The API is considered a violent organization of nationalist nature. In a 2010 interview with The Wall Street Journal, spokespersons for the group acknowledged that the group has "fighters" who seek replacing of Iran's current system with monarchy. On its Facebook page, as of May 2010 the API called for "the overthrow of the Islamic regime... by ALL MEAN[s]!!!!". The API's official website observed by Al-Monitor in August 2020, made references to charges from Iranian government about its involvement in violent attacks, but did not deny them. Iranian intelligence minister had said in 2020 that the group planned 27 attacks, many of them foiled before orchestration.

Activities and alleged activities

Bombings
The Jamestown Foundation reported that the organization took responsibility for the 2008 Shiraz explosion at the Hosseynieh Seyed al-Shohada Mosque where 12 people were killed and 202 injured.  Mohammad-Reza Ali-Zamani and Arash Rahmanipour, alleged by the government to be members of the assembly, were arrested and tried for the bombing by the Judiciary of the Islamic Republic of Iran. In January 2010 they were executed for moharebeh ("waging war against God") and attempting to overthrow the Iranian government. An Assembly spokesperson has denied that Ali Zamani had played any role in the post-election protests, stating that he had worked with the organization, but his job was "simply to pass on news for our radio station and to make broadcast packages".

2005
In 2005, 56 Iranians staging a sit-in against the Iranian Islamic government were arrested at the Brussels airport for refusing to leave a Lufthansa plane. At least one protester, Armin Atshgar, identified himself as a member of the group and told the press that "We want the European Union to remove the Islamic leaders from Iran."  The group was also reportedly active at the annual Nowruz Persian parade in New York City.

2010
In 2010, the Iranian regime accused the organization of planning terror attacks in Iran. The group runs pro-Iranian opposition radio and television stations and has called for the overthrowing of the Iranian government.

The group members have denied that the group is a terrorist organization and denied involvement with the attacks in Iran.

Iran analysts said Iran may be pointing the finger at Tondar because it prefers to "blame the internal dissent and tumult on outside forces".

2020
On 1 August 2020, Iran's Ministry of Intelligence announced they detained Jamshid Sharmahd, spokesperson of the assembly. Iranian state television (IRIB) broadcast a report on Sharmahd's arrest, linking him to the 2008 bombing of the Hosseynieh Seyed Al-Shohada Mosque in Shiraz. It also said his group was behind a 2010 bombing at Ruhollah Khomeini's mausoleum in Tehran that wounded several people.

See also
 Monarchism in Iran

References

External links
 Invitation for debate on Islam, Published by Washington post.
Website

Defunct organisations based in Iran
Militant opposition to the Islamic Republic of Iran
Monarchism in Iran
Monarchist organizations
Terrorism in Iran
Organisations designated as terrorist by Iran
Organizations based in Asia designated as terrorist
Iran–United States relations
Defunct organizations based in California